Antoine Kahn is an American professor of electrical engineering and is a fellow of such societies as the American Vacuum Society since 1999 and American Physical Society to which he was elected in 2002. In 1974 he received a diploma from the Grenoble Institute of Technology in electronic engineering and also has both master's and Ph.D. degrees from Princeton University which he obtained in 1976 and 1978 respectively.

References

American electrical engineers
20th-century births
Year of birth missing (living people)
Living people
Fellows of the American Physical Society
Grenoble Institute of Technology alumni
Princeton University alumni
20th-century American engineers
21st-century American engineers